Calvin Orin Ridley (born December 20, 1994) is an American football wide receiver for the Jacksonville Jaguars of the National Football League (NFL). He played college football at Alabama, where he was a part of the national championship-winning teams in 2015 and 2017. Drafted by the Atlanta Falcons in the first round of the 2018 NFL Draft, he was named to the PFWA All-Rookie Team and earned second-team All-Pro honors in 2020. 

After announcing midway through the 2021 season that he would be stepping away from football due to mental health reasons, it was later revealed that Ridley would be suspended indefinitely through at least the conclusion of the 2022 season for violating the league's gambling policy. While suspended, he was traded to the Jaguars and was later reinstated the following year.

Early life
Calvin Orin Ridley was born to Colin Ridley and Kay Daniels in Fort Lauderdale, Florida on December 20, 1994. He is the eldest of 4 brothers. His younger brother, Riley Ridley, played college football for Georgia and was drafted in the 4th round of the 2019 NFL Draft. On October 31, 2002, Ridley and his younger brothers were taken to a foster home after their father was deported back to Guyana and their mother was imprisoned.

When he was younger, Ridley played Pop Warner football in the same league as Baltimore Ravens quarterback Lamar Jackson, Arizona Cardinals wide receiver Marquise Brown and Ravens cornerback Trayvon Mullen, in the Pompano Beach area of Florida just four miles from the high school he would attend. Ridley attended Monarch High School in Coconut Creek, Florida, where he played high school football for the Knights. He played only three games in his senior year due to Florida age restriction rules, which doesn't allow anyone over the age of 19 and nine months to be eligible. 

Ridley was rated as a five-star recruit and was considered the best receiver in the class of 2015 according to 247Sports, Rivals, and ESPN. He committed to the University of Alabama to play college football on April 19, 2014. He began enrollment at Alabama on June 19, 2015.

College career

Ridley attended and played college football at the University of Alabama under Nick Saban from 2015 to 2017. 

Ridley earned immediate playing time as a true freshman in 2015. In his first career game on September 5, 2015, he had three receptions for 22 yards against the University of Wisconsin. He scored his first collegiate touchdown in a victory over Louisiana-Monroe on September 26. In the following game, against Georgia, he had five receptions for 120 yards and a touchdown in the victory. He followed that up with 140 receiving yards and a touchdown in a victory over Arkansas. In the SEC Championship against Florida, he had eight receptions for 102 yards in the victory. The Alabama Crimson Tide made the College Football Playoff. In the 38–0 victory over Michigan State in the Cotton Bowl, he had 138 receiving yards and two touchdowns. In the National Championship against Clemson, he was held to six receptions for 14 yards but the Crimson Tide won the National Championship by a score of 45–40. Ridley led the SEC in receptions with 89 in 2015.

In the 2016 season, Ridley remained a strong threat for the Crimson Tide. In the second game of the season, he had nine receptions for 129 receiving yards and a touchdown against Western Kentucky. On October 1, Ridley hauled in 11 receptions for 174 yards and two touchdowns against the University of Kentucky. His 11 receptions, 174 yards, and two touchdowns were career highs. Over the remainder of the 2016 season, he had 41 receptions for 371 receiving yards and four touchdowns. Alabama once again won the SEC Championship and made the College Football Playoff. However, they fell to Clemson in a rematch in the National Championship.

In the 2017 season, Ridley started off strong with seven receptions for 82 yards and a touchdown in the 24–7 victory over Florida State. On November 11, against Mississippi State, he had five receptions for 171 receiving yards in the victory. Alabama made the College Football Playoff once again in the 2017 season. In the National Semifinal, Ridley had four receptions for 39 yards in the Sugar Bowl. In the National Championship against Georgia, he had four receptions for 32 yards and the late game-tying touchdown to help force overtime in the 26–23 victory.

On January 10, 2018, it was announced that Ridley would forgo his senior year at Alabama in favor of the 2018 NFL Draft.

Collegiate statistics

Professional career

Atlanta Falcons

Ridley was drafted by the Atlanta Falcons in the first round with the 26th overall pick in the 2018 NFL Draft. On July 5, 2018, Ridley signed a four-year deal worth $10.9 million featuring a $6.1 million signing bonus.

2018 season 

After a quiet NFL debut against the Philadelphia Eagles in Week 1, he had four receptions for 64 yards and his first NFL touchdown in a 31–24 victory over the Carolina Panthers. On September 23, in Week 3, Ridley recorded seven receptions for 146 yards and three touchdowns in a 43–37 overtime loss to the New Orleans Saints. He followed that up with four receptions for 54 yards and two touchdowns in the next game against the Cincinnati Bengals.

Ridley was named the Offensive Rookie of the Month for September after collecting six touchdown receptions, which was the most in the league and tied an NFL record for a rookie in his first four games. In Week 17 against the Tampa Bay Buccaneers, Ridley broke the Falcons single-season receiving touchdowns by a rookie record after scoring 10 touchdowns. The record was previously set by Junior Miller in 1980. Ridley finished the 2018 season leading all rookies in both receiving yards and receiving touchdowns, as well as leading all rookie wide receivers in receptions. He was named to PFWA All-Rookie Team, becoming the fourth Atlanta Falcons receiver to get this award, joining Shawn Collins (1989), Mike Pritchard (1991), and Julio Jones (2011).

2019 season 
In Week 1 against the Minnesota Vikings, Ridley caught four passes for 64 yards and the first receiving touchdown of the season as the Falcons lost 12–28. In Week 2 against the Philadelphia Eagles, Ridley caught eight passes for 105 yards and a touchdown as the Falcons won 24–20. In Week 11 against the Carolina Panthers, Ridley finished with eight catches for 143 receiving yards and a touchdown as the Falcons won 29–3. In Week 14 against the Carolina Panthers, Ridley had five catches for 76 receiving yards and a touchdown in the 40–20 win. Ridley suffered an abdominal injury during the game and was ruled out for the rest of the season. Overall, Ridley finished the 2019 season with 63 receptions for 866 receiving yards and seven receiving touchdowns.

2020 season 
In Week 1 against the Seattle Seahawks, Ridley recorded a career-high nine receptions for 130 yards and two receiving touchdowns as the Falcons lost 25–38. In Week 2 against the Dallas Cowboys, Ridley caught seven passes for 109 yards and two touchdowns during the 39–40 loss. Ridley tied Andre Rison for the franchise record for the most receiving touchdowns in the team's first two games of a season with four. Ridley posted his third consecutive 100-yard game in Week 3, posting five receptions for 110 receiving yards in a 26–30 loss to the Chicago Bears.
In the following week's game against the Carolina Panthers, Ridley continued his early season form, recording eight catches for 136 yards during the 23–16 loss.

In Week 14 against the Los Angeles Chargers, Ridley recorded eight catches for 124 yards and a touchdown during the 20–17 loss.
In Week 15 against the Tampa Bay Buccaneers, Ridley recorded ten catches for 163 yards and a touchdown during the 31–27 loss.
In Week 16 against the Kansas City Chiefs, Ridley recorded five catches for 130 yards during the 17–14 loss. Ridley was named to the Associated Press' All-Pro 2nd Team for his performance during the 2020 season. He finished the 2020 season with 90 receptions for 1,374 yards and nine receiving touchdowns. He was ranked 65th by his fellow players on the NFL Top 100 Players of 2021.

In March 2023, Ridley revealed that he had played the majority of the 2020 season with a broken foot.

2021 season 

On May 3, 2021, the Falcons exercised the fifth-year option on Ridley's contract. The option guarantees a salary of $11.1 million for the 2022 season. 

In Week 1 against the Philadelphia Eagles, Ridley caught 5 passes for 51 yards in the 32–6 loss. Against the Tampa Bay Buccaneers in Week 2, Ridley caught his first receiving touchdown of the season to go along with 7 receptions for 63 yards. The next week against the New York Giants, Ridley finished the game with 8 receptions for 61 yards as the Falcons picked up their first win of the season, winning 17–14. After not traveling with the Falcons for their London game against the New York Jets the previous week due to an undisclosed personal matter, Ridley returned on October 24 against the Miami Dolphins, catching 4 passes for 26 yards and a touchdown, helping the Falcons win 30–28.

On October 31, Ridley announced on Twitter that he was stepping away from football due to mental health reasons. Ridley finished the season with 31 receptions for 281 receiving yards and two receiving touchdowns in five games played.

Suspension

The NFL announced on March 7, 2022, that Ridley would be suspended indefinitely through at least the conclusion of the 2022 season for betting on games in the previous season, including on his own team. He forfeited his base salary of $11.1M for 2022.

Jacksonville Jaguars
On November 1, 2022, despite being suspended for at least the entire 2022 season, the Falcons traded Ridley to the Jacksonville Jaguars for conditional 2023 sixth-round and 2024 fourth-round picks. The 2023 pick can become a fifth-rounder if Ridley is reinstated and the 2024 pick can either become a third-round pick based on playing time or a second-round pick if he signs a long-term extension.

On February 15, 2023, Ridley applied for reinstatement, his first day eligible to do so. He was officially reinstated on March 6, just a day before the first anniversary of his initial suspension.

NFL career statistics

NFL records
 Most receiving touchdowns by a rookie in his first four games: 6 (Tied with Martavis Bryant - 2014)

Falcons franchise records
 Most receiving touchdowns in a season by a rookie: 10
 Most receiving touchdowns in the first two games of a season: 4 (Tied with Andre Rison - 1994)

Personal life 
Ridley is married and has a daughter who was born in 2020.

On September 12, 2021, Ridley and his wife's home was robbed while Ridley was playing against the Philadelphia Eagles. Ridley’s wife was left traumatized while Ridley started developing anxiety following the robbery.

References

External links

Alabama Crimson Tide bio
Jacksonville Jaguars bio

1994 births
Living people
Alabama Crimson Tide football players
American football wide receivers
Atlanta Falcons players
Jacksonville Jaguars players
People from Coconut Creek, Florida
Players of American football from Florida
Sportspeople from Broward County, Florida